Senior master sergeant is the military rank for a senior non-commissioned officer in the armed forces of some countries.

Philippines

Armed forces
Senior master sergeant is the second-highest attainable rank for enlisted personnel of the Philippine Army, the Philippine Air Force and the Philippine Marine Corps (a component of the Philippine Navy). 

The rank stands above that of master sergeant and below that of chief master sergeant.

Philippine National Police
As of February 8, 2019, a new ranking classification for the Philippine National Police was adopted, eliminating confusion of old ranks. The Police Senior master sergeant is third highest non-commissioned officer rank on the service. It stands above the rank of Police Master sergeant and below the Police Chief master sergeant.

United States
U.S. Space Force<br/ >senior master sergeantinsignia
U.S. Air Force<br/ >senior master sergeantinsignia

Senior master sergeant (abbreviated SMSgt) is the eighth-highest enlisted rank (pay grade E-8) in the United States Air Force and United States Space Force, just above master sergeant and below chief master sergeant, and is a senior noncommissioned officer (SNCO).

According to Air Force Instruction 36-2618, The Enlisted Force Structure:
SMSgts are key, experienced, operational leaders, skilled at merging their personnel's talents, skills, and resources with other teams' functions to most effectively accomplish the mission. SMSgts continue to develop their leadership and management skills in preparation for expanded responsibilities and higher leadership positions. SMSgts normally operate at the operational level of leadership.

Promotion to senior master sergeant is the most difficult enlisted promotion to attain in the Air Force and Space Force. It is the second enlisted grade in which results of a central promotion board is the only factor in selection for promotion. Usually, less than ten percent of eligible master sergeants are selected for promotion to senior master sergeant in most years. Selectees typically have vast technical and leadership experience gained from a broad variety of assignments at both line and staff functions during their careers. Additionally, the successful candidate typically has completed an associate or bachelor's degree in their Air Force and Space Force specialty as well as the Senior Noncommissioned Officer Correspondence Course, and has had his or her latest performance report endorsed by a senior rater, usually a colonel or brigadier general.

in preparation for promotion to the rank of chief master sergeant, senior master sergeants typically assume superintendent duties, overseeing enlisted members' efforts to accomplish a major segment of a unit's mission. They are expected to serve as mentors for noncommissioned and junior commissioned officers.
U.S. Air Force<br/ >Insignia of a<br/ >U.S. Air Force<br/ >senior master sergeant<br/ >serving as<br/ >first sergeant
Public Law 107-107, the "National Defense Authorization Act", establishes senior enlisted strength levels for all branches of the United States Armed Forces. Currently, only 2.5 percent of the Air Force's total active duty enlisted strength may hold this rank.

Senior master sergeants are sometimes referred to by the nickname of "Senior." In the past, this was a casual nickname that was inappropriate in formal situations. However, on 12 July 2018, new Air Force regulations were issued that made "Senior" one of the official terms of address for senior master sergeants, in addition to the pre-existing "Senior Master Sergeant" and "Sergeant" addresses.

Senior master sergeants in the first sergeant special duty serve as first sergeants of larger units than those employing master sergeants as first sergeants. These first sergeants (pay grades E-7 to E-9) are referred to officially as "First Sergeant" (regardless of their pay grade), and unofficially as "First Shirt" or simply "Shirt".

Historical note
U.S. Air Force<br/ >senior master sergeantinsignia (obsolete)

Although the Air Force had been an independent service since 1947, the rank of senior master sergeant did not come into being until the authorization of the Military Pay Act of 1958. This act established the pay grades of E-8 and E-9 but without title. It was not until late 1958 that the title of "senior master sergeant" (and the accompanying rank insignia) was decided upon after the enlisted force was polled. At that time, the senior master sergeant rank had only a single chevron above and six below, and a chief master sergeant two above and six below. In 1994 the Air Force changed its noncommissioned officer insignia so that a maximum of five stripes were placed on the bottom of the chevrons, adding one above to each of the top three grades, resulting in the present form.

Civil Air Patrol
Civil Air Patrol<br/ >senior master sergeantinsignia
The Civil Air Patrol (CAP), a non-profit corporation Congressionally chartered to operate as the civilian auxiliary of the U.S. Air Force, has a quasi-military structure which includes the rank of senior master sergeant. The grade of senior master sergeant is below chief master sergeant and above master sergeant. Former military enlisted personnel who held the rank of senior master sergeant in the United States Armed Forces may retain that rank as members of the CAP.

See also
 Sergeant
 United States military pay
 U.S. Air Force enlisted rank insignia

References
 Air Force Instruction 36-2618, The Enlisted Force Structure
 Technical Sergeant Spink, Barry L.  "A Chronology of the Enlisted Rank Chevron of the United States Air Force, 19 February 1992."  Air Force Historical Research Agency.

Enlisted ranks of the United States Air Force
Enlisted ranks of the United States Space Force
United States military enlisted ranks